Parapsestis odilei is a moth in the family Drepanidae. It was described by Orhant in 2006. It is found in Thailand.

References

Moths described in 2006
Thyatirinae
Moths of Asia